Austin Thabani Dube (born 16 November 1992) is a South African professional soccer player who plays as a defender for South African club Kaizer Chiefs and the South African national soccer team

Club career 
Dube played for Witbank Spurs F.C. before joining a Mpumalanga-based PSL team TS Galaxy F.C. Austin Dube joined a South African football team  Richards Bay F.C. for 2020/21 season in the National First Division where he made 6 appearances and scored 1 goal.

On 20 July 2021, Dube signed a three-year contract with Kaizer Chiefs.

International career
He made his debut for South Africa national soccer team on 6 July 2021 in a 2021 COSAFA Cup game  against Botswana. South Africa won the tournament.

References

External links 

 

1992 births
Living people
South African soccer players
South Africa international soccer players
Association football defenders
Witbank Spurs F.C. players
TS Galaxy F.C. players
Richards Bay F.C. players
Kaizer Chiefs F.C. players